Brian Garrow (born April 8, 1968) is a former professional tennis player from the United States.

Garrow competed in doubles events from 1988 through 1992, winning two titles and reaching a top ranking of World No. 42 in 1991.

Garrow's top singles ranking was World No. 93, achieved in late October 1990.  He captured one challenger tournament, the 1989 Winnetka Challenger, and reached the semi-finals in one Grand Prix event, the 1990 Rio de Janeiro Open.  Garrow played on the tour in singles from 1988 through 1991, competing  in challenger events.

Garrow was a three-time all-American at UCLA. He was the first player in the 1980s to reach the NCAA finals for both the singles and doubles tournament in the same year, 1988, winning the doubles partnering Patrick Galbraith. He lost in the singles final to Robbie Weiss of Pepperdine.

Career finals

Doubles (2 titles, 2 runner-ups)

References

External links
 
 

American male tennis players
People from Santa Clara, California
Tennis people from California
UCLA Bruins men's tennis players
1968 births
Living people